Calosoma peksi is a species of ground beetle in the subfamily of Carabinae. It was described by Heinz & Pavesi in 1995.

References

peksi
Beetles described in 1995